Adam Müller is a German publicist, literary critic, political economist and theorist.

Adam Müller or Mueller may refer to:

 Adam August Müller, Danish history painter
 Adam "Ademo Freeman" Mueller, cofounder of Cop Block